Jim Hubbard (born 1949) is a New Zealand cartoonist. He joined the Daily Telegraph (Napier, New Zealand) in 1985. His work has appeared in a number of New Zealand newspapers, including the Dominion Post, Bay of Plenty Times, the Southland Times, the Daily Telegraph (Napier), the Northern Advocate and the Otago Daily Times. He won the New Zealand Cartoonist of the Year in 2011 at the Canon Media Awards. 

Along with Garrick Tremain, Eric Heath and Burton Silver, he designed a stamp for New Zealand Post in 1997.

External links 
 Search for work relating to Jim Hubbard on DigitalNZ

References 

1949 births
Living people
New Zealand cartoonists